Naturally occurring erbium (68Er) is composed of 6 stable isotopes, with 166Er being the most abundant (33.503% natural abundance). 39 radioisotopes have been characterized with between 74 and 112 neutrons, or 142 to 180 nucleons, with the most stable being 169Er with a half-life of 9.4 days, 172Er with a half-life of 49.3 hours, 160Er with a half-life of 28.58 hours, 165Er with a half-life of 10.36 hours, and 171Er with a half-life of 7.516 hours. All of the remaining radioactive isotopes have half-lives that are less than 3.5 hours, and the majority of these have half-lives that are less than 4 minutes. This element also has numerous meta states, with the most stable being 167mEr (t1/2 2.269 seconds).

The isotopes of erbium range in atomic weight from 141.9723 u (142Er) to 176.9541 u (177Er). The primary decay mode before the most abundant stable isotope, 166Er, is electron capture, and the primary mode after is beta decay. The primary decay products before 166Er are holmium isotopes, and the primary products after are thulium isotopes. All isotopes of erbium are either radioactive or observationally stable, meaning that they are predicted to be radioactive but no actual decay has been observed.

List of isotopes 

|-
| 142Er
| style="text-align:right" | 68
| style="text-align:right" | 74
| 141.97002(54)#
| 10# μs
| p
| 141Ho
| 0+
|
|
|-
| rowspan=2| 143Er
| style="text-align:right" rowspan=2| 68
| style="text-align:right" rowspan=2| 75
| rowspan=2| 142.96655(43)#
| rowspan=2| 200# ms
| β+
| 143Ho
| rowspan=2|9/2−#
| rowspan=2|
| rowspan=2|
|-
| β+, p
| 142Dy
|-
| 144Er
| style="text-align:right" | 68
| style="text-align:right" | 76
| 143.96070(21)#
| 400# ms [>200 ns]
| β+
| 144Ho
| 0+
|
|
|-
| rowspan=2| 145Er
| rowspan=2 style="text-align:right" | 68
| rowspan=2 style="text-align:right" | 77
| rowspan=2| 144.95787(22)#
| rowspan=2| 900(200) ms
| β+
| 145Ho
| rowspan=2|1/2+#
| rowspan=2|
| rowspan=2|
|-
| β+, p (rare)
| 144Dy
|-
| rowspan=3 style="text-indent:1em" | 145mEr
| rowspan=3 colspan="3" style="text-indent:2em" | 205(4)# keV
| rowspan=3| 1.0(3) s
| β+
| 145Ho
| rowspan=3| (11/2-)
| rowspan=3|
| rowspan=3|
|-
| IT (rare)
| 145Er
|-
| β+, p (rare)
| 144Dy
|-
| rowspan=2|146Er
| rowspan=2 style="text-align:right" | 68
| rowspan=2 style="text-align:right" | 78
| rowspan=2|145.952418(7)
| rowspan=2|1.7(6) s
| β+
| 146Ho
| rowspan=2|0+
| rowspan=2|
| rowspan=2|
|-
| β+, p (rare)
| 145Dy
|-
| rowspan=2|147Er
| rowspan=2 style="text-align:right" | 68
| rowspan=2 style="text-align:right" | 79
| rowspan=2|146.94996(4)#
| rowspan=2|3.2(1.2) s
| β+
| 147Ho
| rowspan=2|(1/2+)
| rowspan=2|
| rowspan=2|
|-
| β+, p (rare)
| 146Dy
|-
| rowspan=2 style="text-indent:1em" | 147mEr
| rowspan=2 colspan="3" style="text-indent:2em" | 100(50)# keV
| rowspan=2| 1.6(2) s
| β+
| 147Ho
| rowspan=2| (11/2−)
| rowspan=2|
| rowspan=2|
|-
| β+, p (rare)
| 146Dy
|-
| rowspan=2|148Er
| rowspan=2 style="text-align:right" | 68
| rowspan=2 style="text-align:right" | 80
| rowspan=2|147.944735(11)#
| rowspan=2|4.6(2) s
| β+ (99.85%)
| 148Ho
| rowspan=2|0+
| rowspan=2|
| rowspan=2|
|-
| β+, p (.15%)
| 147Dy
|-
| style="text-indent:1em" | 148mEr
| colspan="3" style="text-indent:2em" | 2.9132(4) MeV
| 13(3) μs
| IT
| 148Er
| (10+)
|
|
|-
| rowspan=2|149Er
| rowspan=2 style="text-align:right" | 68
| rowspan=2 style="text-align:right" | 81
| rowspan=2|148.94231(3)
| rowspan=2|4(2) s
| β+ (92.8%)
| 149Ho
| rowspan=2|(1/2+)
| rowspan=2|
| rowspan=2|
|-
| β+, p (7.2%)
| 148Dy
|-
| rowspan=3 style="text-indent:1em" | 149m1Er
| rowspan=3 colspan="3" style="text-indent:2em" | 741.8(2) keV
| rowspan=3|8.9(2) s
| β+ (96.5%)
| 149Ho
| rowspan=3|(11/2−)
| rowspan=3|
| rowspan=3|
|-
| IT (3.5%)
| 149Er
|-
| β+, p (.18%)
| 148Dy
|-
| style="text-indent:1em" | 149m2Er
| colspan="3" style="text-indent:2em" | 2.6111(3) MeV
| 0.61(8) μs
| IT
| 149Er
| (19/2+)
|
|
|-
| style="text-indent:1em" | 149m3Er
| colspan="3" style="text-indent:2em" | 3.302(7) MeV
| 4.8(1) μs
| IT
| 149Er
| (27/2−)
|
|
|-
| 150Er
| style="text-align:right" | 68
| style="text-align:right" | 82
| 149.937916(18)
| 18.5(7) s
| β+
| 150Ho
| 0+
|
|
|-
| style="text-indent:1em" | 150mEr
| colspan="3" style="text-indent:2em" | 2.7965(5) MeV
| 2.55(10) μs
| IT
| 150Er
| 10+
|
|
|-
| 151Er
| style="text-align:right" | 68
| style="text-align:right" | 83
| 150.937449(18)
| 23.5(20) s
| β+
| 151Ho
| (7/2−)
|
|
|-
| rowspan=2 style="text-indent:1em" | 151m1Er
| rowspan=2 colspan="3" style="text-indent:2em" | 2.5860(5) MeV
| rowspan=2|580(20) ms
| IT (95.3%)
| 151Er
| rowspan=2|(27/2−)
| rowspan=2|
| rowspan=2|
|-
| β+ (4.7%)
| 151Ho
|-
| style="text-indent:1em" | 151m2Er
| colspan="3" style="text-indent:2em" | 10.2866(10) MeV
| 0.42(5) μs
| IT
| 151Er
| (65/2-, 61/2+)
|
|
|-
| rowspan=2|152Er
| rowspan=2 style="text-align:right" | 68
| rowspan=2 style="text-align:right" | 84
| rowspan=2|151.935050(9)
| rowspan=2|10.3(1) s
| α (90%)
| 148Dy
| rowspan=2|0+
| rowspan=2|
| rowspan=2|
|-
| β+ (10%)
| 152Ho
|-
| rowspan=2|153Er
| rowspan=2 style="text-align:right" | 68
| rowspan=2 style="text-align:right" | 85
| rowspan=2|152.935086(10)
| rowspan=2|37.1(2) s
| α (53%)
| 149Dy
| rowspan=2|7/2(−)
| rowspan=2|
| rowspan=2|
|-
| β+ (47%)
| 153Ho
|-
| style="text-indent:1em" | 153m1Er
| colspan="3" style="text-indent:2em" | 2.7982(10) MeV
| 373(9) ns
| IT
| 153Er
| (27/2-)
|
|
|-
| style="text-indent:1em" | 153m2Er
| colspan="3" style="text-indent:2em" | 5.2481(10) MeV
| 248(32) ns
| IT
| 153Er
| (41/2-)
|
|
|-
| rowspan=2|154Er
| rowspan=2 style="text-align:right" | 68
| rowspan=2 style="text-align:right" | 86
| rowspan=2|153.932791(5)
| rowspan=2|3.73(9) min
| β+ (99.53%)
| 154Ho
| rowspan=2|0+
| rowspan=2|
| rowspan=2|
|-
| α (.47%)
| 150Dy
|-
| rowspan=2|155Er
| rowspan=2 style="text-align:right" | 68
| rowspan=2 style="text-align:right" | 87
| rowspan=2|154.933216(7)
| rowspan=2|5.3(3) min
| β+ (99.978%)
| 155Ho
| rowspan=2|7/2−
| rowspan=2|
| rowspan=2|
|-
| α (.022%)
| 151Dy
|-
| rowspan=2| 156Er
| rowspan=2 style="text-align:right" | 68
| rowspan=2 style="text-align:right" | 88
| rowspan=2| 155.931066(26)
| rowspan=2| 19.5(10) min
| β+
| 156Ho
| rowspan=2| 0+
| rowspan=2|
| rowspan=2|
|-
| α (1.2%)
| 152Dy
|-
| 157Er
| style="text-align:right" | 68
| style="text-align:right" | 89
| 156.931923(28)
| 18.65(10) min
| β+
| 157Ho
| 3/2−
|
|
|-
| style="text-indent:1em" | 157mEr
| colspan="3" style="text-indent:2em" | 155.4(3) keV
| 76(6) ms
| IT
| 157Er
| (9/2+)
|
|
|-
| 158Er
| style="text-align:right" | 68
| style="text-align:right" | 90
| 157.929893(27)
| 2.29(6) h
| EC
| 158Ho
| 0+
|
|
|-
| 159Er
| style="text-align:right" | 68
| style="text-align:right" | 91
| 158.930691(4)
| 36(1) min
| β+
| 159Ho
| 3/2−
|
|
|-
| style="text-indent:1em" | 159m1Er
| colspan="3" style="text-indent:2em" | 182.602(24) keV
| 337(14) ns
| IT
| 159Er
| 9/2+
|
|
|-
| style="text-indent:1em" | 159m2Er
| colspan="3" style="text-indent:2em" | 429.05(3) keV
| 590(60) ns
| IT
| 159Er
| 11/2−
|
|
|-
| 160Er
| style="text-align:right" | 68
| style="text-align:right" | 92
| 159.929077(26)
| 28.58(9) h
| EC
| 160Ho
| 0+
|
|
|-
| 161Er
| style="text-align:right" | 68
| style="text-align:right" | 93
| 160.930004(9)
| 3.21(3) h
| β+
| 161Ho
| 3/2−
|
|
|-
| style="text-indent:1em" | 161mEr
| colspan="3" style="text-indent:2em" | 396.44(4) keV
| 7.5(7) μs
| IT
| 161Er
| 11/2−
|
|
|-
| 162Er
| style="text-align:right" | 68
| style="text-align:right" | 94
| 161. 9287873(8)
| colspan=3 align=center|Observationally Stable
| 0+
| 0.00139(5)
|
|-
| style="text-indent:1em" | 162mEr
| colspan="3" style="text-indent:2em" | 2.02601(13) MeV
| 88(16) ns
| IT
| 162Er
| (7-)
|
|
|-
| 163Er
| style="text-align:right" | 68
| style="text-align:right" | 95
| 162.930040(5)
| 75.0(4) min
| β+
| 163Ho
| 5/2−
| 
| 
|-
| style="text-indent:1em" | 163mEr
| colspan="3" style="text-indent:2em" | 445.5(6) keV
| 580(100) ns
| IT
| 163Er
| (11/2−)
|
|
|-
| 164Er
| style="text-align:right" | 68
| style="text-align:right" | 96
| 163.9292077(8)
| colspan=3 align=center|Observationally Stable<ref group="n">Believed to undergo α decay to 160Dy or β+β+ to 164Dy</ref>
| 0+
| 0.01601(3)
|
|-
| 165Er
| style="text-align:right" | 68
| style="text-align:right" | 97
| 164.9307335(10)
| 10.36(4) h
| EC
| 165Ho
| 5/2−
|
|
|-
| style="text-indent:1em" | 165m1Er
| colspan="3" style="text-indent:2em" | 551.3(6) keV
| 250(30)ns
| IT
| 165Er
| 11/2-
|
|
|-
| style="text-indent:1em" | 165m2Er
| colspan="3" style="text-indent:2em" | 1.8230(6) MeV
| 370(40)ns
| IT
| 165Er
| (19/2)
|
|
|-
| 166Er
| style="text-align:right" | 68
| style="text-align:right" | 98
| 165.9303011(4)
| colspan=3 align=center|Observationally Stable
| 0+
| 0.33503(36)
|
|-
| 167Er
| style="text-align:right" | 68
| style="text-align:right" | 99
| 166.9320562(3)
| colspan=3 align=center|Observationally Stable
| 7/2+
| 0.22869(9)
|
|-
| style="text-indent:1em" | 167mEr
| colspan="3" style="text-indent:2em" | 207.801(5) keV
| 2.269(6) s
| IT
| 167Er
| 1/2−
|
|
|-
| 168Er
| style="text-align:right" | 68
| style="text-align:right" | 100
| 167.93237828(28)
| colspan=3 align=center|Observationally Stable
| 0+
| 0.26978(18)
|
|-
| style="text-indent:1em" | 168mEr
| colspan="3" style="text-indent:2em" | 1.0940383(16) MeV
| 109.0(7) ns
| IT
| 168Er
| 4-
|
|
|-
| 169Er
| style="text-align:right" | 68
| style="text-align:right" | 101
| 168.9345984(3)
| 9.392(18) d
| β−
| 169Tm
| 1/2−
|
|
|-
| style="text-indent:1em" | 169m1Er
| colspan="3" style="text-indent:2em" | 92.05(10) keV
| 285(20) ns
| IT
| 169Er
| (5/2-)
|
|
|-
| style="text-indent:1em" | 169m2Er
| colspan="3" style="text-indent:2em" | 243.69(17) keV
| 200(10) ns
| IT
| 169Er
| 7/2+
|
|
|-
| 170Er
| style="text-align:right" | 68
| style="text-align:right" | 102
| 169.9354719(15)
| colspan=3 align=center|Observationally Stable
| 0+
| 0.14910(36)
|
|-
| 171Er
| style="text-align:right" | 68
| style="text-align:right" | 103
| 170.93803746(15)
| 7.516(2) h
| β−
| 171Tm
| 5/2−
|
|
|-
| style="text-indent:1em" | 171mEr
| colspan="3" style="text-indent:2em" | 198.61(9) keV|
| 210(10) ns
| IT
| 171Er
| 1/2−
|
|
|-
| 172Er
| style="text-align:right" | 68
| style="text-align:right" | 104
| 171. 939363(4)
| 49.3(5) h
| β−
| 172Tm
| 0+
|
|
|-
|-
| style="text-indent:1em" | 172mEr
| colspan="3" style="text-indent:2em" | 1.5009(3) MeV
| 579(62) ns
| IT
| 172Er
| (6+)
|
|
|-
| 173Er
| style="text-align:right" | 68
| style="text-align:right" | 105
| 172.94240(21)#
| 1.434(17) min
| β−
| 173Tm
| (7/2−)
|
|
|-
| 174Er
| style="text-align:right" | 68
| style="text-align:right" | 106
| 173.94423(32)#
| 3.2(2) min
| β−
| 174Tm
| 0+
|
|
|-
| style="text-indent:1em" | 174mEr
| colspan="3" style="text-indent:2em" | 1.1115(7) MeV
| 3.9(3) s
| IT
| 174Er
| 8-
|
|
|-
| 175Er
| style="text-align:right" | 68
| style="text-align:right" | 107
| 174.94777(43)#
| 1.2(3) min
| β−
| 175Tm
| 9/2+#
|
|
|-
| 176Er
| style="text-align:right" | 68
| style="text-align:right" | 108
| 175.94994(43)#
| 12# s (>300 ns)
| β−
| 176Tm
| 0+
|
|
|-
| 177Er
| style="text-align:right" | 68
| style="text-align:right" | 109
| 176.95399(54)#
| 8# s (>300 ns)
| β−
| 177Tm
| 1/2−#
|
|
|-
| 178Er
| style="text-align:right" | 68
| style="text-align:right" | 110
| 177.95678(64)#
| 4# s (>300 ns)
| β−
| 178Tm
| 0+
|
|
|-
| rowspan=2| 179Er
| rowspan=2 style="text-align:right" | 68
| rowspan=2 style="text-align:right" | 111
| rowspan=2| 178.96127(54)#
| rowspan=2| 3# s (>550 ns)
| β−
| 179Tm
| rowspan=2| 3/2−#
| rowspan=2|
| rowspan=2|
|-
| β−, n
| 178Tm
|-
| rowspan=2| 180Er
| rowspan=2 style="text-align:right" | 68
| rowspan=2 style="text-align:right" | 112
| rowspan=2| 179.96438(54)#
| rowspan=2| 2# s (>550 ns)
| β−
| 180Tm
| rowspan=2| 0+
| rowspan=2|
| rowspan=2|
|-
| β−, n
| 179Tm

Erbium-169

The radioactive isotope erbium-169 is sometimes used in radiopharmaceuticals.

References 

 Isotope masses from:

 Isotopic compositions and standard atomic masses from:

 Half-life, spin, and isomer data selected from the following sources.

 
Erbium
Erbium